The South Shore Line  is an electrically powered interurban commuter rail line operated by the Northern Indiana Commuter Transportation District (NICTD) between Millennium Station in downtown Chicago and the South Bend International Airport in South Bend, Indiana, United States. The name refers to both the physical line and the service operated over that route. The line was built in 1901–1908 by predecessors of the Chicago South Shore and South Bend Railroad, which continues to operate freight service. Passenger operation was assumed by the NICTD in 1989. The South Shore Line is one of the last surviving interurban trains in the United States.

Route 
Departing South Bend Airport, the South Shore Line heads south alongside Bendix Drive, then west along Westmoor Street, before connecting with the tracks that ran to its former terminus. Between that point and Hudson Lake, Indiana, the South Shore Line runs parallel to Norfolk Southern's Chicago Line, also used by Amtrak's Lake Shore Limited and Capitol Limited, on the north side of the tracks. Just before Hudson Lake, the line crosses from St. Joseph County into LaPorte County and enters the Central Time Zone.

From Hudson Lake, the South Shore continues straight west to Michigan City. In Michigan City, the track runs down the middle of 11th street from Michigan Boulevard to Tennessee Street, where it crosses over to Tenth Street, and has an at-grade diamond with Amtrak's Michigan Services. The track then runs down Tenth Street to Sheridan Avenue on the west side of Michigan City. Leaving Michigan City, the track travels through Indiana Dunes State Park, crosses over the Chicago Line and runs parallel to it, this time on the south side, past Long Lake. At Gary, Indiana, the route heads west to service the Gary Airport, at times running parallel to the Indiana Toll Road, as far as Hammond, Indiana. Just west of the Hammond station, the route crosses into Illinois and Chicago city limits, at which point the track curves northwest, through the Hegewisch neighborhood and, after crossing the Bishop Ford Freeway and the Calumet River, converges with the Metra Electric line south of Kensington/115th Street station. The South Shore Line then runs over the Metra Electric from Kensington/115th Street the rest of the way to Millennium Station.

The line is quadruple tracked along the section shared with the Metra Electric line from Millennium Station to Kensington/115th Street, double-tracked from Kensington/115th Street to east of Gary Metro Center. From there it is single-tracked with passing sidings to South Bend Airport, save for a  stretch of double track around Ogden Dunes and the yard at Michigan City. On January 7, 2021, an agreement was announced between the Federal Transit Administration and the Northern Indiana Commuter Transportation District to double-track an additional  between Gary and Michigan City at an estimated total cost of $491 million, including improvements to grade crossings and upgrades to five stations.

Service 
The public Monday-Friday timetable shows 20 eastbound trains operating; 18 of those operate out of Millennium Station. Of those, five terminate at Adam Benjamin Metro Center in Gary, seven at South Bend Airport, and 10 at Carroll Avenue station in Michigan City. Two daily trains begin at Carroll Avenue and continue to South Bend Airport.

Westbound, 16 trains operate, with seven originating in South Bend (including one rush-hour express to Millennium Station) and nine originating at Carroll Avenue. Of these, 14 terminate at Millennium Station, while two run from South Bend to Carroll Avenue.

History

Private operation 

The South Shore Line was constructed between 1901 and 1908 by the Chicago and Indiana Air Line Railway (reorganized as the Chicago, Lake Shore and South Bend Railway [CLS&SB] in 1904). Revenue service between Michigan City and South Bend began on July 1, 1908. The CLS&SB leased the Kensington and Eastern Railroad on April 4, 1909, giving it access to Chicago. That year the full line to Kensington on the Illinois Central was completed, and beginning on June 2, 1912, the electric cars were coupled to IC steam locomotives and run to downtown Chicago.

The Chicago, Lake Shore and South Bend entered bankruptcy in 1925 and was bought by Samuel Insull's Chicago South Shore and South Bend Railroad (CSS&SB). The line continued to handle both freight and passengers. Under Insull, the CSS&SB embarked on a major rehabilitation program. This included new ballast and ties,  rail in place of  rail, brush clearance, and an overhaul of the line's block signals. In 1949, the company acquired three Little Joe electric locomotives for freight service. These locomotives had originally been constructed for the Soviet Union, but changing attitudes due to the Cold War prevented them from being delivered. Although the exact same type as the Milwaukee Joes, the South Shore bought them before the Milwaukee did. These locomotives continued in freight service on the CSS&SB until 1983. No. 803, is preserved in operating condition at the Illinois Railway Museum.

The power system was changed from 6600 volts AC to 1500 volts DC on July 28, 1926, allowing trains to operate directly to the Illinois Central Railroad's Randolph Street Terminal (now Millennium Station) without an engine change. Trains began running to Randolph Street on August 29. That same year, the original line between East Chicago and Indiana Harbor was abandoned.

The Chicago South Shore and South Bend turned a profit during World War II due to the industrial nature of Northern Indiana. However, highway competition and suburban growth led to ridership declines. By the 1950s all interurban lines were seeing a decline in rail travel as automobile use increased. On September 16, 1956, a street running section in East Chicago was removed with the building of a new alignment alongside the Indiana Toll Road. A truncation to west of downtown South Bend removed street trackage in that city from July 1, 1970.

The Chesapeake and Ohio Railway acquired the CSS&SB on January 3, 1967 and continued the operation of passenger services. The Chicago South Shore and South Bend was one of six railroads with long-distance passenger services to decline joining Amtrak in 1971 and in 1976, they asked the Interstate Commerce Commission (ICC) to abandon passenger service. The ICC gave the state of  Indiana a chance to reply and subsequently, the Northern Indiana Commuter Transportation District (NICTD) was formed in 1977 to subsidize service.

Public operation 

In the late 1980s, the Chicago South Shore and South Bend went bankrupt and on December 29, 1989, passenger service was assumed by NICTD. In December 1990, the track was sold to NICTD and freight service was taken over by the new Chicago South Shore and South Bend Railroad, a subsidiary of short line operator Anacostia & Pacific. On November 21, 1992, the line's South Bend terminus moved from the Amtrak station to the airport. On July 5, 1994, NICTD closed the Ambridge, Kemil Road, Willard Avenue, LaLumiere, Rolling Prairie, and New Carlisle flag stops. A seventh station, Dune Acres, closed around the same time once parking was expanded at nearby Dune Park.

The railroad began a 3-year project in 2009 to replace all catenary on its line between Michigan City and Gary, some of which was nearly 90 years old. The project cost $18 million, and caused service disruptions on weekends while new wires were strung.

The Chicago Region Environmental and Transportation Efficiency Program (CREATE), replaced a bridge on the South Shore Line across 130th Street, Torrence Avenue, and Norfolk Southern tracks in the Hegewisch neighborhood of Chicago as a part of a four-year project lasting from 2011 to 2015. The 2,350 ton bridge would be put in place in August 2012.

In 2015 NICTD began an express service between South Bend and Chicago. Targeted at business travelers, the train makes just two intermediate stops: Dune Park and East Chicago. The total scheduled travel time is 1 hour 55 minutes, more than thirty minutes faster than existing services.

In July 2020 during the COVID-19 pandemic, NICTD implemented "mask optional cars" for riders choosing not to wear masks, as Indiana did not have a statewide mask mandate. This has received controversial reception, as it does not help slow down the spread of the coronavirus disease, and the "mask optional" car is also the only car with bike racks. On November 14, 2020, the "mask optional cars" were discontinued, requiring all passengers to wear a mask.

Rolling stock

Current 

The South Shore Line operates with a fleet of 82 rail cars built between 1982 and 2009 by Nippon Sharyo. The fleet consists of 58 single-level self-propelled cars, 10 single-level unpowered trailers, and 14 bilevel self-propelled cars. The single level fleet's design shares commonalities with MARC's locomotive-hauled MARC II fleet, which were also built by Nippon Sharyo. An additional 26 cars are planned to be acquired, replacing those to be transferred to West Lake Corridor services.

Retired 

Pullman and the Standard Steel Car Company delivered electric multiple units to  the CSS&SB between 1926 and 1929. Many were lengthened in the 1940s and 1950s.

Fare policies 
The South Shore Line uses a zone-based fare system, with prices based on the distance traveled and stations' proximity to Millennium Station. There are a total of eleven zones (1–11). Tickets may be purchased at stations, online, and through the South Shore mobile app. Ticket options include one-way, 10-ride, 25-ride, and monthly passes. One-way tickets may also be purchased on trains, but will incur a $1.00 penalty fee if a ticket agent was present at the departure station. Children aged 13 years and under, seniors aged 65 and over, passengers with disabilities, students, active-duty military personnel, and those holding RTA Reduced Fare Permits are eligible for reduced fares. NICTD accepts cash aboard trains, cash and checks at ticket offices, and credit cards online and at Millennium Station's ticket office. Most stations have ticket machines which only accept credit cards. For travel to Hegewisch station (zone 3), fares are set by Metra.

Proposed expansions and realignments

Michigan City realignment 

Since 2005, there has been an ongoing debate pertaining to plans to relocate trackage off the streets of Michigan City. In July 2009, NICTD announced its intention to relocate the Michigan City track south of its current location in order to smooth out the curves, cut down the number of grade crossings, increase speed and reduce maintenance costs. The plan also calls for the replacement of both current stations with a single new station located a block west of the current 11th Street boarding location (between Franklin and Washington streets) with a modern, high-level platform and parking lot. The plan would require a demolition of residential and retail buildings currently located on the south side of 11th Street.

The relocation effort faced a setback in March 2010 when NICTD announced that it was short necessary funds to complete the preliminary engineering study. Unless the funding was found, the relocation would have been postponed indefinitely since, without the engineering study, NICTD would not be able to get state and federal funds necessary to complete the relocation. NICTD and the city continued to work on obtaining the funds needed. In 2011 NICTD accepted bids for a $1 million study, expected to take 18 months. The study was completed in October 2013. The preferred alternative identified by the study preserves an alignment similar to the current route but relocates the tracks alongside the street. It proposes replacing the two existing stations with a new station near the center of Michigan City. The realignment would be done as a part of the double track project from Gary to Michigan City.

Street running ended on February 27, 2022. Currently, buses are to replace trains within this section until the opening of the new alignment.

Valparaiso branch 
At a legislative hearing in October 2008, NICTD officials said they would drop further study of a Munster-to-Valparaiso route, and begin study of a Gary–Valparaiso route. At the hearing, NICTD officials said the projected cost of $673 million for the Munster-to-Valparaiso route as well as low projected ridership would have made it ineligible for federal funding and opted to study the Gary-to-Valparaiso route instead. The Gary-to-Valparaiso route would utilize the partially abandoned former Pennsylvania Railroad line. NICTD officials contend the shorter length of a Gary-to-Valparaiso run and the chance to use existing tracks there may make it a lower-cost alternative to the Munster-to-Valparaiso route.

Extension to Elkhart 
In the 1980s and 1990s, there was some discussion about the possibility of extending the line from South Bend east to Elkhart County, Indiana. In 1988, Elkhart, Indiana mayor James Perron pushed for the government to look into making long-term plans for an extension into his city. It is analogous of Metra Electric Line extension to Kankakee.

Proposed new stations
There are proposals to replace the South Bend terminus with a new station.

There is a proposal to reestablish a station in New Carlisle.

West Lake Corridor 
 
NICTD planned to apply for federal funding for a preliminary engineering study and environmental survey of a Hammond-to-Lowell leg in 2009.  , that leg had a projected price tag of $551 million.  , the cost has increased to $665 million. NICTD was awarded funding in the spring of 2020 and the line broke ground in October 2020. The project is estimated to open to revenue service in 2025.

The new line will run through Munster to Dyer, with a possible later extension to St. John, and trains will run as shuttles between Hammond and Dyer during off-peak hours.  The alignment of the new branch leaves the old CSS&SB main immediately before the current Hammond station.  Hence, the NICTD has decided to build a new station in Hammond to serve both branches.

Station listing 

The line operates over the tracks of the Metra Electric Line from Millennium Station to Kensington-115th Street. Metra owns the track in this territory. Per a long-standing non-compete clause with Metra, outbound South Shore Line trains to Indiana only stop at Metra Electric stations to receive passengers; inbound trains to Millennium Station only stop at Metra Electric stations to discharge passengers.

South Shore Line trains make the following station stops:

See also
Proposed new South Shore Line station in South Bend

Notes

References

External links 

Official site
Chicago, Illinois / South Bend, Indiana: The South Shore Line
 Hammond, Indiana News Briefs November 2003
 Northern Indiana Commuter Transportation District – Our History

 
Electric railways in Illinois
Electric railways in Indiana
Interurban railways in Illinois
Interurban railways in Indiana
Passenger rail transportation in Illinois
Passenger rail transportation in Indiana
Railway lines in Chicago
Railway services introduced in 1903
Standard gauge railways in the United States
Transportation in Gary, Indiana
Transportation in LaPorte County, Indiana
Transportation in Porter County, Indiana
Transportation in South Bend, Indiana
Commuter rail in the United States
1500 V DC railway electrification
Airport rail links in the United States